Všelibice is a municipality and village in Liberec District in the Liberec Region of the Czech Republic. It has about 600 inhabitants.

Administrative parts
The villages of Benešovice, Březová, Budíkov, Chlístov, Lísky, Malčice, Nantiškov, Nesvačily, Podjestřábí, Přibyslavice, Roveň and Vrtky are administrative parts of Všelibice.

History
The first written mention of Všelibice is from 1419.

References

External links

Villages in Liberec District